Jacques Saada,  (born November 22, 1947) is a Canadian politician and former cabinet minister.
 
Saada is a teacher and linguist by profession and was Chief Executive Officer of a translation firm,  a consultant and a lecturer in translation prior to entering politics.

He was first elected to the House of Commons of Canada as a Liberal Member of Parliament (MP) from the Quebec riding of Brossard—La Prairie in the 1997 federal election. He served as Deputy Government Whip from 2001 to 2003. When Paul Martin became Prime Minister of Canada on December 12, 2003, he had Saada appointed as a privy councillor  (giving him the prenominal "The Honourable" and the postnominal "PC" for life) and to the Cabinet as Minister Responsible for Democratic Reform and Government House Leader.

Following the 2004 election with the election of a Liberal minority government, Saada was transferred to the positions of Minister for the Economic Development Agency of Canada for the Regions of Quebec and Minister responsible for La Francophonie.

Saada was born in Tunis, the main city of Tunisia, to a Jewish family. In the 2004 election his campaign was the target of anti-Semitic graffiti, letters, and phone calls.

Saada was defeated in the 2006 election, losing his seat in Brossard—La Prairie to Bloc Québécois candidate Marcel Lussier. His former constituency assistant, Alexandra Mendès, defeated Lussier in the 2008 election.

He was the Quebec Chair for the Rae campaign for the leadership of the Liberal Party. In September 2007, Saada was named president and chief executive officer of the Quebec Aerospace Association (AQA). He resigned from that position in December 2011.

Electoral record (partial)

References

External links

Background
Statement in the Canadian Parliament, April 9, 2002
Quebec Aerospace Association

1947 births
Canadian people of Tunisian-Jewish descent
Jewish Canadian politicians
Liberal Party of Canada MPs
Living people
Members of the House of Commons of Canada from Quebec
Members of the King's Privy Council for Canada
People from Brossard
People from Tunis
Tunisian emigrants to Canada
Tunisian Jews
Members of the 27th Canadian Ministry